Marco Dittgen (born 19 August 1974) is a German former professional footballer who played as a forward.

References

External links
 

1974 births
Living people
German footballers
Association football forwards
Bundesliga players
2. Bundesliga players
Swiss Super League players
1. FC Kaiserslautern II players
1. FC Kaiserslautern players
Dynamo Dresden players
BSC Young Boys players
FC St. Gallen players
Palermo F.C. players
1. FC Lokomotive Leipzig players
Chemnitzer FC players
SV Waldhof Mannheim players
FC Rot-Weiß Erfurt players
SV Röchling Völklingen players
German expatriate footballers
German expatriate sportspeople in Switzerland
Expatriate footballers in Switzerland
German expatriate sportspeople in Italy
Expatriate footballers in Italy
People from Püttlingen
Footballers from Saarland